Silicon Sorcery was a video game company that existed during the 1990s.

It is now a defunct company that closed down sometime after the 1990s. Their most famous game was California Games 2 for the Amiga, MS-DOS, Sega Master System, and the Super NES.

Video games
 Rampart (1991)
 California Games 2 (1993)

References
 GameFAQs
 GameSpot

Defunct video game companies of the United States
Video game companies established in 1991
Technology companies disestablished in 1994